Andy Wilson (born 25 September 1951) is a former Australian rules footballer who played with Essendon in the VFL during the 1970s.

A rover, Wilson had his best season in 1973 when he kicked 40 goals and won the W. S. Crichton Medal as Essendon's best and fairest player.

External links

1951 births
Living people
Australian rules footballers from Victoria (Australia)
Essendon Football Club players
Warracknabeal Football Club players
Crichton Medal winners